Themba Sonnyboy Sekowe  (born ), known professionally as DJ Maphorisa, is a South African DJ, record producer, singer, and songwriter. As a record producer with a blend of house music, amapiano and afropop, he has worked with and has received production credits from several notable artists, including Wizkid, Sizwe Alakine, Kwesta, Uhuru, Drake, Black Coffee, Major Lazer, Runtown, C4 Pedro, TRESOR, Kabza De Small , Era Istrefi Mpura Young Stunna Killer Kau He was signed to Kalawa Jazmee Records prior to establishing his own record label, BlaqBoy Music.

He rose to stardom after producing several hit singles for artists of multiple music genres, such as  Uhuru ("Y-Tjukuta"), Kwesta ("Ngud'"), Busiswa ("Lahla"), DJ Zinhle ("My name Is"), Professor ("Jezebel") and Shekinah ("Suited").

Career 
In September 2018, he released  a single "Midnight Starring" featuring  Moonchild Sanelly, DJ Tira and Busiswa. At the 2018 DStv Mzansi Viewers Choice Awards he received two  nominations: Favourite Song Of the Year and Favourite DJ. On November 27, 2018, at the third ceremony of Mzansi Kwaito and  House Music Awards  his single "Midnight Starring" won an award for most voted-for song.

2019–present: Rumble in the Jungle,Piano Hub and Banyana EP 
On April 9, 2021, Maphorisa, TRESOR and Kabza De Small released the collaboration studio album Rumble in the Jungle. {{DJ Maphorisa also started Piano Hub with Kabza De Small That made a lot of songs like Bopha, Ziwa Ngale, Abalele, Banyana, London and Trust Fund}} On April 16, 2021, Maphorisa and Tyler ICU's  studio EP Banyana was released. The EP featured Sir Trill, Daliwonga and Kabza De Small, Mpura, and Visca. The single "Banyana" surpassed 4.2 million streams and was certified double platinum by the Recording industry of South Africa. In 2021, he embarked to Made in Lagos Tour for an opening act with Wizkid. At the 2021 Music Kwaito and House Music Awards he received a nomination for Best DJ.

On 17 September 2021, he released a single "Abalele"  with Kabza De Small featuring Ami Faku.

In October 2021, he produced Congolese-born singer TRESOR’s singles, "Makosa" and "Nyota" from the album, Motion.

In November 2022, he worked with Afrika Memani on the Road To Private EP, which was released on the 4th of November.

DJ Maphporisa was received the African DJ of the Year award at the Soundcity MVP Awards which were held at the Eko Convention Centre in Lagos.

Tours

Co-headlining 
 Made in Lagos Tour (2021) (with Wizkid)
 AmaFest (2021)

Discography
Collaborative Albums & EPs
 Our Father  (2013)
 Blaqboy Music Presents Gqom Wave (2017)
 Scorpion Kings EP  (2019)
 The Return of Scorpion Kings  (2019)
 Scorpion King Live At Sun Arena  (2020)
 Once Upon A Time In A Lockdown  (2020)
 Madumane EP (2020)
 Rumble In The Jungle ) (2021)
 Banyana EP ) (2021) 
 Ba Straata 2022

Singles 
Runtown
The Banger
"Omalicha Nwa"

Kwesta
Ngud'
"Mayibabo"
"Afro Trap"

whysl
"Gang"
"Trap"

Mafikizolo
khona

Kucheza
Love Portion

Busiswa
Bazoyenza
Midnight Starring

Himself
Soweto Baby featuring Wizkid and DJ Bucks 

 Kabza De Small
 Itemba Lam
Lorch
Hello
Inhliziyo 

 Focalistic
London with Madumane
Trust Fund with Mpura
Other 
 Banyana featuring Sir Trill Kabza De Small

 Ba Straata ft 2woshort

Singles produced

Awards and nominations

African Muzik Magazine Awards

! 
|-
|2020
|  Himself 
|Music Producer of the 
|
|

Dstv Mzansi Viewers Choice Awards 

|-
|rowspan="2"|2018
| "Midnight Starring"
| Favourite Song Of the Year 
| 
|-
| Himself 
| Favourite DJ
| 
|-
|2022
|  Scorpion Kings 
| Favourite DJ 
|

Humanitarian African Prestigious Awards

|-
|rowspan="2"|
|rowspan="2"|Himself
|Music Producer of The Year
|
|-
|Best DJ Africa
|

MTV Africa Music Awards

|-
|2016
|Himself 
|Song of the Year
|
|-
|2020
|
|Best African Act
|

Mzansi Kwaito and House Music Awards 

|-
|2018
| "Midnight Starring"
| Most Voted Song 
| 
|-
|rowspan="3"|2021
|rowspan="3"|Himself
|Best producer
|
|-  
|rowspan="3"|Best AmaPiano songs
|
|-
|

SA Amapiano Music Awards 

|-
|2021
|Himself
|Best amapiano male DJ/Act
|

Soundcity MVP Awards

! 
|-
|2023
|  Himself 
|African DJ of the Year
|
|

References

External links

1987 births
Living people
Amapiano musicians
South African record producers
South African DJs
South African musicians
Electronic dance music DJs